Supercopa de España Femenina is the third most relevant tournament of Spanish women's water polo. It was established in 2009, being played the match usually in later September or early October.

It's played to a single match between the League's champion and the Copa de la Reina's winner. If a same team wins League & Cup, the Supercopa will be played between the League's champion and the Copa's runners-up.

Winners by year

Titles by team

See also 
División de Honor Femenina
Copa de la Reina

References

External links 
Royal Spanish Swimming Federation

Water polo competitions in Spain